Uttarmand Dam, is an earthfill dam on Uttarmand river near Patan, Satara district in the state of Maharashtra in India.

Specifications

Purpose
 Irrigation

See also
 Dams in Maharashtra
 List of reservoirs and dams in India

References

Dams in Satara district
Dams completed in 2001
2001 establishments in Maharashtra